Erdal Çelik (born 1 January 1988) is a Turkish-German former professional footballer who played as a centre-back.

Personal life
After his retirement as a professional player, Çelik played for VfL Vichttal. He also worked as a youth trainer at his club, VfL Vichttal.

References

External links

Living people
1988 births
Association football defenders
Turkish footballers
German people of Turkish descent
Alemannia Aachen players
Bayer 04 Leverkusen players
Rot Weiss Ahlen players
FC 08 Homburg players
Sumgayit FK players
Wormatia Worms players
3. Liga players